Keith Nelson (born December 12, 1969) is an American former basketball player. He played for the Hobart Devils of the Australian NBL in 1994.

College
After spending his first two seasons playing at a junior college, Nelson took his game to the University of Tennessee at Chattanooga (Chattanooga) in the fall of 1990. He spent two seasons playing at the Southern Conference school, an NCAA Division I institution. In just two seasons he scored 1,047 points, led the Mocs in scoring and rebounding both seasons, and was named the conference co-player of the year as a senior. Nelson, a center, was also a two-time First Team All-SoCon performer who guided Chattanooga to back-to-back co-SoCon regular season championships. His career 9.2 rebounds per game average is tops all-time in school history. In 2004, the university inducted him into their athletics hall of fame.

Professional career
In January 1993, Nelson signed with KR of the Icelandic Úrvalsdeild karla. Nicknamed the "Januaryman" by the press due to him being the fourth foreign player in four months for KR, he performed better than his predecessors and was named as a starter for the 1993 All-Star game. For the season, Nelson averaged 26.6 points and 15.7 rebounds in 11 games for the club.

He played for the Hobart Devils of the Australian NBL in 1994. For the season he averaged 21.6 games, 10.0 rebounds and league leading 2.9 blocks per game.

References

External links
Profile at sports-reference.com
NBL statistics at nbl.com
Úrvalsdeild karla statistics at kki.is

Living people
1969 births
American expatriate basketball people in Australia
American expatriate basketball people in Iceland
American men's basketball players
Basketball players from Louisville, Kentucky
Centers (basketball)
Chattanooga Mocs men's basketball players
Hobart Devils players
Junior college men's basketball players in the United States
KR men's basketball players
Úrvalsdeild karla (basketball) players